McMahons Point ferry wharf is located on the northern side of Sydney Harbour serving the Sydney suburb of McMahons Point. It is served by Sydney Ferries Parramatta River and Pyrmont Bay services operated by First Fleet and RiverCat class ferries.

History

There has been a wharf at McMahons Point since at least 1839, when Blues Point Road was gazetted as a thoroughfare from there to the township of St Leonards. At the beginning of the 20th century, a large number of passenger ferries plied the route between here and the city, with services operating every 10 to 15 minutes. Six million passengers a year were served by the wharf. A tramway opened in 1909 to bring more commuters to the wharf.

When the Sydney Harbour Bridge opened in 1932 the ferry services became redundant, and in 1935 small ferries operated by Hegarty Ferries took over the runs formerly operated by the larger craft of Sydney Ferries Limited to McMahons Point. The wharf has since again become part of the Sydney Ferries network. 

The wharf closed on 13 April 2016 to be replaced by a larger structure. The new wharf is at a 90 degree angle to the shore and has two sides. It reopened on 20 October 2016.

Services

Connections
Busways operate two routes to and from McMahons Point wharf:
254: to Riverview
291: to Epping station

References

External links

McMahons Point Wharf at Transport for New South Wales (archived 12 June 2019)
McMahons Point Local Area Map Transport for NSW

Ferry wharves in Sydney
McMahons Point